Brampton Civic Hospital is an acute care hospital in Brampton, Ontario and part of the William Osler Health System. It is a community teaching hospital for the Michael G. DeGroote School of Medicine of McMaster University.

History
The 608-bed hospital was designed by Parkin Architects Limited in joint venture with Adamson Associates and built by a joint venture of Carillion and EllisDon. The Brampton Civic Hospital is one of Canada's first public hospitals to be designed, built, financed, and maintained under a private-public partnership. It opened in 2007 and replaced the Peel Memorial Hospital which previously served  Brampton and the surrounding area.

Operations
Brampton Civic Hospital currently serves approximately 500,000 residents in Brampton and the surrounding areas. The facility can accommodate 80,000 emergency patient visits and 201,000 ambulatory care visits annually. The hospital has 4,100 employees.

References 

Hospital buildings completed in 2007
Hospitals in the Regional Municipality of Peel
Hospitals established in 2007
Public–private partnership projects in Canada
2007 establishments in Ontario
Teaching hospitals in Canada